"Before I Grew Up To Love You" is a World War I era song released in 1917. Max Friedman wrote the lyrics and music. The song was published by Shapiro, Bernstein & Co. of New York City. There are two versions of the cover. One features a framed photo of Friedman in a sailor's uniform. The second version has a drawing of a man and woman with an orange-colored moon behind them. Below them is a branch of leaves. The song was written for voice and piano.

Henry Burr recorded the song on March 14, 1919. It was released under Columbia Records. The East Texas Serenaders recorded a version of the song. It was released under Brunswick Records.

The sheet music can be found at Pritzker Military Museum & Library.

The song is about a person's heartbreak in response to the end of a relationship. The chorus is a follows:

References

External links 
 View the song MP3 and sheet music here.

1917 songs
Songs of World War I